The Middle Georgia Regional Library System is a library system which serves the counties of Bibb, Crawford, Jones, Macon, Twiggs and Wilkinson in the U.S. state of Georgia.

Patrons receive a PINES library card. This may be used at any of the 275 libraries affiliated with the program across Georgia, as well as the 14 branches in the Middle Georgia Regional Library System, and is open to all Georgian residents.

History

Carnegie Library
The first request for a Carnegie library was sent by a Montezuma citizen by the name of E. B. Lewis in 1906. Blueprints sent along with the petition were modeled very similarly to the Carnegie building constructed one year earlier in Albany. On March 24, 1906, Andrew Carnegie accepted the request and gave the town of Montezuma $10,000 for construction of the building. This came with the stipulation that the town pay an upkeep and maintenance fee of $1,000 per year to keep the building in good condition. Construction began later that year with help from Masons across Georgia. By 1923 this library was seeing circulation of 12,453 books per year, and the $1,000 annual cost of upkeep was still being administered per Carnegie's request.

Branches

Bibb branches
 Washington Memorial Library, Macon
 Riverside Branch, Macon
 Charles A. Lanford, M.D. Library, Macon
 Shurling Branch, Macon
 West Bibb Branch, Macon (closed)
 Bloomfield Library, Macon

Regional branches
 Crawford County Public Library (Roberta, Crawford County)
 Jones County Public Library (Gray, Jones County)
 Ideal Public Library (Ideal, Macon County)
 Marshallville Public Library (Marshallville, Macon County)
 Montezuma Public Library (Montezuma, Macon County)
 Oglethorpe Public Library (Oglethorpe, Macon County)
 Twiggs County Public Library (Jefferson, Twiggs County)
 East Wilkinson County Public Library (Irwinton, Wilkinson County)
 Gordon Public Library (Gordon, Wilkinson County)

Library systems in neighboring counties
Azalea Regional Library System to the north
Oconee Regional Library System to the east
Ocmulgee Regional Library System to the south
Houston County Public Library System to the south
Peach Public Libraries to the south
Lake Blackshear Regional Library System to the south
Pine Mountain Regional Library System to the west

References

External links
MGRLS

Macon metropolitan area, Georgia
Education in Bibb County, Georgia
Education in Twiggs County, Georgia
Education in Macon County, Georgia
Education in Wilkinson County, Georgia
Education in Crawford County, Georgia
Education in Jones County, Georgia
County library systems in Georgia (U.S. state)
Public libraries in Georgia (U.S. state)